Nicholas Southwood is an Australian philosopher and Associate Professor of Philosophy at the Australian National University. 
He is a co-editor of the Journal of Political Philosophy and Director of the Centre for Moral, Social and Political Theory. 
Southwood is known for his research on contractualism and social philosophy.

Books
 Contractualism and the Foundations of Morality, Oxford University Press, 2010, 
 Explaining Norms, with Geoffrey Brennan, Lina Eriksson and Robert E. Goodin, Oxford University Press, 2013,

References

External links
Nicholas Southwood at the ANU

Australian philosophers
Analytic philosophers
Political philosophers
Philosophy academics
Living people
Academic staff of the Australian National University
Year of birth missing (living people)